The Vivekachudamani is an introductory treatise within the Advaita Vedanta tradition of Hinduism, traditionally attributed to Adi Shankara of the eighth century, though this attribution has been questioned and mostly rejected by scholarship.

Vivekachudamani literally means the 'crest-jewel of discrimination'. The text discusses key concepts and the viveka or discrimination or discernment between real (unchanging, eternal) and unreal (changing, temporal), Prakriti and Atman, the oneness of Atman and Brahman, and self-knowledge as the central task of the spiritual life and for Moksha. It expounds the Advaita Vedanta philosophy in the form of a self-teaching manual, with many verses in the form of a dialogue between a student and a spiritual teacher.

Through the centuries, the Vivekachudamani has been translated into several languages and has been the topic of many commentaries and expositions.

Author
The authorship of the Vivekachudamani has been questioned. According to Reza Shah-Kazemi the authorship of Shankara is doubtful, though it is "so closely interwoven into the spiritual heritage of Shankara that any analysis of his perspective which fails to consider [this work] would be incomplete".  According to Michael Comans, a scholar of Advaita Vedanta, though the Hindu tradition popularly believes that Adi Shankara authored the Vivekachudamani, this is "most probably erroneous". Comans gives the following reasons for his doubts: the highly poetic style of the Vivekachudamani is not found in other genuine works of Adi Shankara; there is a lack of extensive commentaries (bhasya) on the Vivekachudamani which is unusual given the extensive commentaries on his other works; and unlike Shankara's other genuine works which give minimal importance to  samadhi practices, the Vivekachudamani gives special importance to it. Though the Vivekachudamani is a popular manual on Vedanta, it is probably the work of a later Shankara, and not Adi Shankara, states Comans. Yet another theory, states Berger, is that "rather than simply having been written or not written by [Adi] Sankara, the Crown Jewel of Discrimination may be a corporately authored work [of Advaita monasteries] that went through revisions".

According to Natalia Isayeva, a scholar of Advaita Vedanta, it is "far less probable" that Adi Shankara authored the Vivekachudamani. Sengaku Mayeda, another scholar of Indian Philosophy and Advaita Vedanta, states that though widely accepted as Shankara's work, the Vivekachudamani is likely not his work.

Paul Hacker, an Indologist and scholar of Advaita, set out a methodology for ascertaining authorship of Advaita texts and he concluded that though the Vivekachudmani is unusual in parts, it was likely authored by Adi Shankara. Hacker stated that the definitions of the key concepts, premises and ideas found in the Vivekachudmani match with those in Shankara's established authentic works. Daniel H. H. Ingalls Sr., another influential Indologist, rejected Hacker's conclusion by accepting Hacker's methodology and presenting evidence from its manuscripts that some of the ideas in the text do not fully agree with those of Adi Shankara.

According to John Grimes, a professor of Hinduism and Buddhism known for his translation of the Vivekachudamani, "modern scholars tend to reject that Adi Shankara composed Vivekachudamani, while traditionalists tend to accept it", and there is an unending "arguments and counter-arguments" about its authorship.

Irrespective of the attribution, the Vivekachudmani is a significant work of Advaita. According to Swami Dayananda Saraswati, a Vedanta teacher, "I do not think we lose anything even if the authorship is attributed to any other Sankaracharya of one of the various Sankara-mathas."

Manuscripts 
Many historic manuscripts of the Vivekachudamani have been found in different monasteries of Advaita Vedanta. These have minor variations, and a critical edition of these has not been published yet. The earliest original Sanskrit manuscript of the Vivekachudamani was published from Srirangam (Tamil Nadu) by T.K. Balasubramania Iyer in 1910. This edition has attracted much of 20th- and 21st-century scholarship, and has been republished in 1983 after some revision and re-arrangement to reflect studies on it since 1910. Other editions have been the basis of a few Indian translations. The five most referred to manuscripts in Advaita scholarship have been published by Samata (Chennai), Advaita Ashrama (Kolkata), Sri Ramakrishna Math (Chennai), Bharatiya Vidya Bhavan (Mumbai), Chinmayananda Ashrama (Mumbai).

Contents 
The Vivekachudamani consists of 580 verses in Sanskrit. These cover a range of spiritual topics and their answers according to the Advaita Vedanta tradition of Hinduism.

The text begins with salutations to Govinda, which can be interpreted either as referring to God or to his guru Sri Govinda Bhagavatpada. It then expounds the significance of Self Realisation, ways to reach it, and the characteristics of a Guru. It criticizes attachment to the body and goes to explain the various Sareeras, Kosas, Gunas, Senses and Pranas which constitute the Anatman. It teaches the disciple the ways to attain Self-realisation, methods of meditation (dhyana) and introspection of the Atman. The Vivekachudamani describes the characteristics of an enlightened human being (Jivanmukta) and a person of steady wisdom (Sthitaprajna) on the lines of Bhagavad Gita.

Significance
The Vivekachudmani has been celebrated for centuries as a lucid introductory treatise to Advaita Vedanta. It is, states Berger, not a "philosophical or polemical" text. It is primarily a pedagogical treatise, as an aid to an Advaitin's spiritual journey to liberation rather than "philosophy for the sake of philosophy". It is one of the texts of "spiritual sustenance" in the Advaita tradition.

The Vivekachudmani is one of several historic teaching manuals in the Advaita tradition, one of its most popular. Other texts that illustrate Advaita ideas in a manner broadly similar to the Vivekachudmani but are neither as comprehensive nor same, include Ekasloki, Svatmaprakasika, Manisapancaka, Nirvanamanjari, Tattvopadesa, Prasnottararatnamalika, Svatmanirupana, Prabodhasudhakara and Jivanmuktanandalahari. These texts are not attributed to Adi Shankara. Upadesasahasri, another Advaita teaching manual, is attributed to Adi Shankara.

Commentaries and translations
There are two Sanskrit commentaries on this work. Sri Sacchidananda Shivabhinava Nrusimha Bharati, the pontiff of Sringeri, wrote a commentary titled Vivekodaya (Dawn of Discrimination) on the first seven verses of this work. His disciple, Sri Chandrasekhara Bharathi, has written a Vyakhya or commentary on the first 515 verses of this work.

This work has been repeatedly translated into various languages, often accompanied by a commentary in the same language. English translations and commentaries include those by Swami Prabhavananda and Christopher Isherwood, Swami Madhavananda, Swami Turiyananda and Swami Chinmayananda. Tamil translations and commentaries include those by Ramana Maharshi. Swami Jyotihswarupananda has translated the Vivekachudamani into Marathi.

A recent scholarly translation of the text was published in 2004 by John Grimes – a professor of Hinduism and Buddhism. His translation has been reviewed by Douglas Berger, who states, "the [Vivekachudmani] translation itself is a testament to Grimes’ surpassing Sanskrit skills and thorough knowledge of Vedantic textual exegesis. The unusually lucid presentation of the Sanskrit slokas is rendered with exactness and eloquent clarity in the English. The accompanying Upanisadic cross-referencing and Sanskrit-English lexicon of key terms will prove themselves enormously helpful to lay readers, students, and scholars."

Hundreds of commentaries in several languages are available on internet in the form of blog articles, videos etc.

Famous verses 
 

Translation: "Brahman is the truth. The world is illusory. There is ultimately no difference between a living being and Brahman." While this verse is frequently attributed to the Vivekachudamani, in fact it comes from Verse 20 of the Brahma Jnana Vali Mala.

 

Translation: "By reflection, reasoning and instructions of teachers, the truth is known,

Not by ablutions, not by making donations, nor by performing hundreds of breath control exercises."

See also 

 Viprata

Notes

References

Sources

Further reading

External links

Vivekachudamani – Multiple Translations (Johnston, Chatterji, Madhavananda)
Complete audio with eng meaning – Part 1
Part 2
Part 3
Part 4
Vivekachudamani with additional notes Translated by Swami Madhavananda, online ebook
The Crest-Jewel of Wisdom: VIVEKACHUDAMANI, By Sankaracharya, Translated by Charles Johnston

Sanskrit texts
Advaita Vedanta
Sanskrit poetry
8th-century works
Adi Shankara
Hindu texts
Advaita Vedanta texts